Tarek Salem (born July 26, 1986) is an Egyptian professional footballer who plays as a centre-forward for the Egyptian club El Raja SC. In 2016, he moved from Al-Ittihad to El Raja SC in a  transfer.

References

1986 births
Living people
El Raja SC players
Egyptian footballers
Association football forwards